Isola del Giglio, or Giglio Island in English, is an Italian island and  (municipality) in the Tyrrhenian Sea, off the coast of Tuscany, and is part of the Province of Grosseto. The island is one of seven that form the Tuscan Archipelago, lying within the Arcipelago Toscano National Park.  means "lily" in Italian, and though the name would appear consistent with the insignia of Medici Florence, it originally derives from the Latin name of the island, which in turn could be related to the Ancient Greek name of the neighbouring Capraia,  (Latinized as ), from   "goat".

In 2012, the cruise ship Costa Concordia foundered off the coast of the island.

Geography
The island is separated by a  stretch of sea from the nearest point of the mainland, the promontory of Monte Argentario. Ninety percent of its surface is covered by Mediterranean vegetation, alternating with large pine forests and numerous vineyards which allow the production of the local "Ansonaco" wine.

The municipality is composed of the islands of Giglio and Giannutri. Three principal settlements are located on the main island: 
 Giglio Porto (G. Harbour), located on the eastern coastal side and hosts the port. It is divided into the quarters of Chiesa, Moletto and Saraceno.
 Giglio Castello (G. Castle), located upon a hill between the two other localities and characterized by the majestic walls of a fortress. It is divided into the quarters of Casamatta, Centro, Cisterna and Rocca.
 Giglio Campese, it is located on the north-western coastal side and is a modern sea resort.

History
The modern island was formed probably 4.5 to 5 million years ago, and has been inhabited since the Stone Age. Later, it was probably an Etruscan military stronghold. Under the Romans it was known as Aegilium Insula or Igillia Insula. It was an important base in the Tyrrhenian Sea,  and was cited briefly by Julius Caesar in his De Bello Civili, by Pliny, by Pomponius Mela, and by the fifth-century AD poet Rutilius Claudius Namatianus, who celebrated Igilium's successful repulse of the Getae and safe harbor for Romans, in a time when Igilium's slopes were still wooded.

In 805, the island was donated by Charlemagne to the abbey of the Tre Fontane in Rome, and was later successively a possession of the Aldobrandeschi, Pannocchieschi, Caetani, and Orsini families, and of the municipality of Perugia. In 1241, the Sicilian and Pisan fleet of Emperor Frederick II destroyed a Genoese fleet in the Battle of Giglio. From 1264, Isola del Giglio was a Pisan dominion, then, after being seized by the Spanish fleet, it was ceded to Antonio Piccolomini, nephew of Pius II from whom it passed to the Medici family in 1558. It suffered several Saracen attacks, which ended only in 1799.

On 14 June 1646, Grand Admiral Jean Armand de Maillé-Brézé was killed at the Battle of Orbetello, at sunset on his flagship the Grand Saint Louis.

Alongside its history, the island was always renowned for its mineral ore: many columns and buildings in Rome were built with the Gigliese granite.

Government

List of mayors

Main sights 

The island houses the remains of a Roman villa of Domitius Ahenobarbus (1st-2nd century AD), in the area of Giglio Porto (Giglio port). No traces of the once existing Temple of Diana  can be seen now. The church of San Pietro Apostolo in Giglio Castello (Giglio castle) has an ivory crucifix attributed to the sculptor Giambologna.

The island is also the site of an Etruscan shipwreck dating back to the early Iron Age, c. 600 BC. The cargo of the ship included copper and lead ingots, iron spits, amphorae and a Corinthian helmet. Even a wooden writing tablet with stylus was preserved. The finds are almost completely lost now.

Transportation
Isola del Giglio is connected to Tuscany by ferries run by the shipping companies Toremar and Maregiglio,  departing daily from Porto Santo Stefano.

Costa Concordia grounding incident

In 2012, the island received prolonged international media attention, following the 13 January 2012 running aground of the cruise liner Costa Concordia, just off the island's shore. Most of the more than 4,200 passengers and crew were rescued and taken to the island, as well as to the mainland. 32 people died and 64 were injured. The people of the island rushed to help, providing hot drinks and blankets, and many opened their homes to the victims. The arrival of 2,000 salvage workers invigorated life on the island, and many of the workers fraternised with the islanders. Some local women left the island with their new partners.

The ship removal work was started in 2013 and was completed towards the end of July 2014. Flotation devices were attached to right the ship and then raise it. It was subsequently towed to its final destination port of Genoa to be scrapped.

In popular fiction
In the 2007 romantic bestselling Italian novel Scusa ma ti chiamo amore by Federico Moccia, the couple end up living in a lighthouse on this island.

It is also the site of the sea burial of the captain of The Pharaon in The Count of Monte Cristo.

COVID-19 
In July 2020, the island attracted global attention because it had not yet experienced any known cases of COVID-19.

Sister cities
 , San Quirico d'Orcia since 2013

See also
 List of islands of Italy
 Tuscan Archipelago

References

External links 

 
Tourist and Visitor Information for Isola del Giglio

Giglio
Arcipelago Toscano National Park
Province of Grosseto
Islands of the Tyrrhenian Sea